FC Guantánamo is a Cuban football team playing in the Cuban National Football League and representing Guantánamo Province. They play their home games at 5,000-capacity Estadio Rogelio Palacios.

It finished as runner-up to Villa Clara in the 2010–11 season.

Current squad
2018 Season

References

Football clubs in Cuba
Guantánamo